Friends is a 2001 Indian Tamil-language drama film, directed by Siddique in his Tamil debut and produced by Appachan. It is the Tamil remake of Siddique's own 1999 Malayalam film of the same name. The film stars Vijay, Suriya and Ramesh Khanna as the friends, while Devayani, Vijayalakshmi, Abhinayashree, Sriman, Vadivelu, Charle, and Radha Ravi play supporting roles. The music was composed by Ilaiyaraaja, while Anandakuttan handled cinematography.

Friends released on 14 January 2001. It received positive reviews and became a commercial success. This film also marks the second collaboration of Vijay and Suriya after Nerrukku Ner (1997).

Plot 
Aravindan, Chandru and Krishnamoorthy have been best friends since childhood. They value friendship above everything else, including family. Thus, Chandru resists the romantic overtures of Aravindan's younger sister Amudha. Chandru, an orphan, stays with Aravindan and is considered by Aravindan's parents as a second son. Some brushes with the law force Aravindan and Chandru to lie low in Chennai for a couple of days, where they and Krishnamoorthy take up jobs as painters in a mansion under contractor Nesamani, Krishnamoorthy's paternal uncle. Aravindan falls in love with Padmini, who lives in the mansion, though Padmini only considers him as a friend; nevertheless, she is grateful to him when he saves her from an accidental electrocution.

However, Padmini's cousin Abhirami has a crush on Aravindan and is enraged when she realizes that he is in love with Padmini. Abhirami sends false letters to him in Padmini's name and makes him believe that his love is reciprocated. When Padmini suddenly gets engaged to another man, Chandru stands up for Aravindan’s love and insults Padmini in front of her entire family, causing her engagement to get cancelled. This makes Padmini decide to marry Aravindan, but with the intention to take revenge on Chandru by breaking his and Aravindan's friendship. But during their marriage, Aravindan and Padmini realise that Abhirami is behind all the mishaps which had taken place, and that Chandru is innocent. Padmini reconciles with Chandru, and Chandru's and Amutha's wedding is fixed.

Gowtham is Aravindan's cousin who lusts for Amutha. He plans to separate Aravindan and Chandru so that he can marry Amutha. He first sets Amutha's sari on fire while she is cooking in the kitchen. Chandru blames Padmini for the mishap as she was in the kitchen with Amutha at the time, even though Padmini is innocent, but no one, including Aravindan, believes Chandru. Gowtham then turns his eye on the annual bullock race in which Chandru is taking part, by loosening the wheels on Chandru's cart with the intention to cause a serious accident and frame Padmini as the culprit, thus creating a wedge between Chandru and Aravindan. Unfortunately for Gowtham, Aravindan decides to take part in the race in Chandru's place since Chandru is to be married, and manages to win despite using the broken bullock cart.

Chandru accuses Padmini of trying to kill him. Padmini threatens to leave the house if Aravindan remains friends with Chandru and does not throw him out of the house. Aravindan then reveals to her that he had accidentally killed Chandru's deaf-and-dumb younger brother Chinna when they were children, which traumatized him so much that he never told anyone about it. Since then, he has been looking out for Chandru out of the guilt that he had no one else in his life anymore. Gowtham overhears their conversation and makes this known by Chandru. Chandru fights with Aravindan, breaks their friendship and leaves the house. Aravindan tries to convince Chandru to return and marry Amutha, even if he cannot repair their friendship. However, in the process, Aravindan falls from a cliff.

Five years later, Chandru is a Major in the Indian Army and has never returned to Aravindan's home since his presumed death. He receives a letter from Krishnamoorthy stating that Aravindan is not dead, but in a vegetative state, not responding to anyone and only sitting in a corner. Chandru immediately leaves for Aravindan's house, where he also learns that Aravindan and Padmini have a young son whose name is Chandru, in tribute to their friendship. Meanwhile, Gowtham, who has been torturing Padmini and Amutha since Aravindan went into the vegetative state, finds that Chandru has returned and beats him up. On hearing Chandru's cries, Aravindan wakes up and subdues Gowtham and his goons. Ultimately, Aravindan, Chandru and Krishnamoorthy, as well as Padmini and Amutha, are reunited.

Cast

Production 

After appearing together in Nerrukku Ner (1997), Vijay and Suriya came together again in this film, a remake of the 1999 Malayalam film Friends.  Meena was approached to play the female lead as she did the original Malayalam version. Due to dates problem, she could not be part of it. Later Jyothika was signed along with Suvaluxmi to play the lead actresses in the film but soon backed out due to date problems and were replaced by Devayani and new girl Vijayalakshmi from Mysore. Shooting was held in a fast pace on Tamil Nadu locations (Ooty, Pollachi, Pazhani, Coimbatore, Udumalaipettai and Chennai).

Soundtrack 
The music was composed by Ilaiyaraaja who composed for the original Malayalam version. Lyrics of the songs were penned by Palani Bharathi.

Release and reception 

Friends was released on 14 January 2001, Pongal day. Malathi Rangarajan of The Hindu stated, "With friendship as the theme, Siddique presents a decent entertainer, which of course could have been crisper." Shilpa Kannan from Zee TV noted "at last, we have one thoroughly enjoyable picture this year" and "except for the end, which is a bit melodramatic, Friends is an excellent movie for debutant director Siddique." Ananda Vikatan rated the film 42 out of 100. Despite facing competition with Ajith Kumar's Dheena, Friends emerged a commercial success, running for more than 175 days in theatres and became a hit for the careers of Vijay and Suriya.

See also 
 Pray for Nesamani

References

External links 
 

2000s Tamil-language films
2001 drama films
2001 films
Films directed by Siddique
Films scored by Ilaiyaraaja
Films set in country houses
Films shot in Chennai
Films shot in Coimbatore
Films shot in New Zealand
Films shot in Ooty
Films shot in Palani
Films shot in Pollachi
Indian Army in films
Indian buddy films
Indian drama films
Super Good Films films
Tamil remakes of Malayalam films